Mansour Assoumani Gammali (born 30 January 1983) is a French footballer who currently plays for US Le Pontet. A centre-back who can also play at right full-back, he is 6 feet 2 inches tall. His parents originate from the Comoros.

Career
Assoumani began his career in the French First Division with Montpellier HSC on 18 August 2001. He played 72 matches for the club (43 in D1, 29 in D2) and registered four goals (two in D1 and two in D2). After five seasons he joined the German club 1. FC Saarbrücken and, subsequently, Sportfreunde Siegen. Prior to joining Leeds United, Assoumani spent time on trial at Sheffield United but failed to impress sufficiently to earn a permanent deal.

Leeds United
On 17 December 2008, Assoumani was handed a one-month contract with League One team Leeds United after a successful trial which also saw him score a goal in a reserve team game against York City. He made his debut three days later in a 3–1 defeat to Milton Keynes Dons. He played the first half at right-back, but due to the substitution of Ľubomír Michalík at half-time, Assoumani played the second half in his more favoured position of centre-back.

Assoumani was unfortunate that Gary McAllister who signed him was sacked after the game after a run of 5 defeats in a row. Assoumani didn't figure at all under new manager Simon Grayson. He was released on 18 January 2009. On 22 January 2009 he was offered a week-long trial with Crewe Alexandra however he was released without being offered a contract.

Wrexham
On 26 March 2009, Assoumani joined Conference National side Wrexham, making his debut on 7 April in a 0–0 draw with Histon.

Stockport County

Assounami signed for League Two side Stockport County on 2 August 2010. Assoumani scored his first goal for County in their 2–0 win over Macclesfield Town on 4 September 2010.

After making 36 appearances for county, in May 2011 he was informed that he would not be offered a contract by the club for the 2011/12 season.

Assoumani Thistle FC

In tribute to Mansour, a group of university students set up a football team in honour of his name. Assoumani Thistle F.C compete in the University of Central Lancashire's Student Union League. They finished 9th in their opening season and reached the semi-finals of the knockout cup competition. They returned the following season, and finished fourth in the league. The team disbanded in 2013 due to scheduling conflicts.

References

External links
Official website 
Mansour Assoumani profile at the Wrexham website

1983 births
Living people
French sportspeople of Comorian descent
Footballers from Nice
French footballers
Association football defenders
Montpellier HSC players
1. FC Saarbrücken players
Sportfreunde Siegen players
Leeds United F.C. players
Wrexham A.F.C. players
Stockport County F.C. players
FC Istres players
Ligue 1 players
Ligue 2 players
English Football League players
National League (English football) players
Expatriate footballers in England
Expatriate footballers in Wales
Expatriate footballers in Germany